Learning the Law is a book written by Glanville Williams and edited by him and A. T. H. Smith. It professes to be a "Guide, Philosopher and Friend".

The tome is a "standard" work which has been called a "classic", and said to be "useful" and "most original". The Law Journal said they expected it to become a vade mecum for those studying law. The University of London encouraged their students to use the book.

The first eleven editions are by Glanville Williams. The First and Second Editions were published in 1945, the Third in 1950, the Fourth in 1953, the Fifth in 1954, the Sixth in 1957, the Seventh in 1963, the Eighth in 1969, the Ninth in 1973, the Tenth in 1978, the Eleventh in 1982, the Twelfth in 2002, the Thirteenth in 2006, the Fourteenth in 2010, the Fifteenth in 2013, and the Sixteenth in 2016. A Second Impression Revised of the Second Edition was published in 1946. The Seventh, and Ninth to Eleventh, Editions also had more than one impression. The book has been published both in hardback and paperback.

References

Julius J Marke (ed), A Catalogue of the Law Collection at New York University with Selected Annotations, Law Center of New York University, 1953, Library of Congress Catalog card 58-6489, Reprinted by The Lawbook Exchange Ltd. (Union, New Jersey) 1999, p 231
G D G Hall (1951) 14 Modern Law Review 106 JSTOR
M P Furmston (1958) 21 Modern Law Review 336 JSTOR
D J LLD (1946) 9 Cambridge Law Journal 253 JSTOR
(1953) 215 The Law Times 210 Google Books
"Reviews" (1954) 118 The Law Times 292 Google Books
(1958) 225 The Law Times 137 Google Books
"Legal Literature" (1945) 95 The Law Journal 130, see also p 387 Google Books
(1958) 108 The Law Journal 238 Google Books
(1983) 132 New Law Journal 606 Google Books
(2003) 153 The New Law Journal 559 Google Books
(1963) 107 Solicitors Journal 629 Google Books
(1970) 113 Solicitors Journal 810 Google Books
(1954) 118 Justice of the Peace and Local Government Review 822 Google Books
"Shorter Notices" (1974) 138 Justice of the Peace 236 Google Books
Industrial Law Review, April 1953
(1955) 8 Industrial Law Review 228 Google Books
(1949) 66 Scottish Law Review and Sheriff Court Reports 216 Google Books
(1969) 20 Northern Ireland Legal Quarterly 486 Google Books
(1953) The Irish Jurist, vols 19-20, p 7, Google Books:  
G P R Tallinn (1946) 24 Canadian Bar Review 640 Google Books:  
Gilbert D Kennedy (1953) 31 Canadian Bar Review 1184 Google Books
University of Western Australia, Annual Law Review, volume 1, 1948, p 566 Google Books
Noel Lyon. Inside Law School: Two Dialogues about Legal Education. University of Calgary Press. 1999. Pages 69.
Peter R. Lewis. The Literature of the Social Sciences: An Introductory Survey and Guide. Library Association. 1960 Pages 152 and 155. Google Books

Law books
1945 non-fiction books